Mandvi is one of the 182 Legislative Assembly constituencies of Gujarat state in India. It is part of Surat district and is reserved for candidates belonging to the Scheduled Tribes. This seat was created in 2008 delimitation and it is a segment of Bardoli Lok Sabha constituency.

List of segments
This assembly seat represents the following segments,

 Mandvi Taluka
 Songadh Taluka (Part) Villages – Sadadkuva, Samarkuva, Amaldi, Singalvan, Ajvar, Otatokarva, Borda, Jhari Amba, Gundi, Vajpur, Satkashi, Kuilivel, Amalpada, Bavli, Serulla, Limbi, Sar Jamli, Nindvada, Bhatvada, Khervada, Junai, Ghasiya Medha, Sisor, Panch Pipla, Bhanpur, Jamapur, Vekur, Bori Savar, Vadda P Bhensrot, Singal Khanch, Bundha, Silatvel, Patharda, Vadi Bhensrot, Singpur, Vaghnera, Dhajamba, Veljhar, Chikhli Bhensrot, Vajharda, Bedvan P Bhensrot, Ukhalda, Jhadpati, Galkhadi, Pipalkuva, Moti Khervan, Nani Khervan, Ghoda, Bhurivel, Bhimpura, Vagda, Gunsada, Dumda, Amlipada, Kelai, Kavla, Amli, Bedi, Agasvan, Nishana, Achhalva, Bedvan Khadka, Kikakui, Mandal, Chakalia, Ukai (CT).

Members of Vidhan Sabha
 1962 -  RAMJIBHAI RAJIABHAI CHAUDHARI (INC)
 1967 - P. D. PATEL (INC)
 1972 - VINODBHAI M CHAUDHARI (INC)
 1975-2007 ASSEMBLY SEAT KNOWN AS SONGADH
 2012 - Parbhubhai Vasava (INC)
 2014 -by poll -ANAND CHAUDHARI (INC)

Election results

2022

2017

2014 by-poll

2012

See also
 Gujarat Legislative Assembly
 List of constituencies of Gujarat Legislative Assembly

References

External links
 

Assembly constituencies of Gujarat
Surat district